Paul Besselink (born 17 November 1967) is a Dutch fencer. He competed in the team épée event at the 1988 Summer Olympics.

Father of Senna Yoelle Loisa Besselink (born 29 Oktober 2005).

Now entrepreneur for Tangla lightning&Living and Besselink Licht.

References

1967 births
Living people
Dutch male fencers
Olympic fencers of the Netherlands
Fencers at the 1988 Summer Olympics
Sportspeople from Arnhem
20th-century Dutch people